Comic Book Resources, also known by the initialism CBR, is a website dedicated to the coverage of comic book–related news and discussion.

History
Comic Book Resources was founded by Jonah Weiland in 1995 as a development of the Kingdom Come Message Board, a message forum that Weiland created to discuss DC Comics' then-new mini-series of the same name.

Comic Book Resources features columns written by industry professionals that have included Robert Kirkman, Gail Simone, and Mark Millar. Other columns are published by comic book historians and critics such as George Khoury and Timothy Callahan.

In April 2016, Comic Book Resources was sold to Valnet Inc., a Montreal-based company based known for its acquisition and ownership of media properties including Screen Rant. The site was relaunched as CBR.com on August 23, 2016, with the blogs integrated into the site.

The company has also hosted a YouTube channel since 2008, with 3.97 million subscribers as of December 21, 2021.

Comic Book Idol
Comic Book Idol, also known as CBI, is an amateur comic-book art competition created and hosted by comics writer J. Torres, and sponsored by Comic Book Resources and its participating advertisers. Inspired by the singing contest American Idol, CBI is a five-week and five-round competition in which each contestant is given one week to draw a script provided by guest judges. These invited comic-book professionals comment on the artists' work in each round. The contestants to move on to subsequent rounds are selected by fans who vote in a weekly poll.

 Patrick Scherberger won CBI1 and has since worked on a number of Marvel Comics titles like Marvel Adventures: Spider-Man, Marvel Adventures: Hulk and GeNext.
 Jonathan Hickman was the runner-up in CBI1 and went on to work for Virgin Comics (Guy Ritchie's Gamekeeper and Seven Brothers), Image Comics (Pax Romana, A Red Mass for Mars and Transhuman) and Marvel Comics (Fantastic Four, Astonishing Tales).
 Carlos Rodríguez won CBI2 and went on to work on Shadowhawk for Image and Batman and the Outsiders for DC Comics.
 Billy Penn also competed in CBI2 and went on to work on Savage Dragon.
 Joe Infurnari, another CBI2 contestant, went on a couple of titles from Oni Press, including Wasteland and Borrowed Time, as well as on the back-up feature of Jersey Gods with Mark Waid.
 Dan McDaid, writer and artist on various Doctor Who comics for Panini and IDW and Jersey Gods for Image Comics, as well as strips for DC Comics, competed in CBI3.
 Nick Pitarra competed in CBI3 and went on to do work for Marvel Comics on books such as Astonishing Tales.
 Charles Paul Wilson III, artist on The Stuff of Legend, competed in CBI3.

Reception
In 2008, the University at Buffalo's research library described Comic Book Resources as "the premiere comics-related site on the Web."

In April 2013, comics writer Mark Millar said he read the site every morning after reading the Financial Times.

Awards
1999: Won the "Favourite Comics-Related Website (professional)" Eagle Award.
2000: Won the "Favourite Comics-Related Website (professional)" Eagle Award.
2001: Won the "Favourite Comics-Related Website (professional)" Eagle Award.
2004: Nominated for the "Favourite Comics-Related Website" Eagle Award.
2005: Nominated for the "Favourite Comics-Related Website" Eagle Award.
2006: Nominated for the "Favourite Comics-Related Website" Eagle Award.
2007: Nominated for the "Favourite Comics Related Website" Eagle Award.
2008: Nominated for the "Favourite Comics-Related Website" Eagle Award.
2009: Won the "Best Comics-Related Periodical/Journalism" Eisner Award.
2010: Won the "Favourite Comics-Related Website" Eagle Award.
2011: Won the "Favourite Comics-Related Website" Eagle Award.
2011: Won the "Best Comics-Related Periodical/Journalism" Eisner Award.
2013: Won the "Best Biographical, Historical or Journalistic Presentation" Harvey Award for its Robot 6 blog.
2014: Won the "Best Comics-Related Periodical/Journalism" Eisner Award.

Controversy
In 2014, an article by guest author Janelle Asselin criticized the cover of DC Comics's Teen Titans, leading to harassment of and personal threats against Asselin in the website's community forums. Weiland issued a statement apologizing for the incident, condemning the way some community members had reacted, and rebooted the forums in order to establish new ground rules.

References

External links

 

American entertainment news websites
Eisner Award winners for Best Comics-Related Periodical/Journalism
Internet properties established in 1995
Websites about comics